Business systems planning (BSP) is a method of analyzing, defining and designing the information architecture of organizations. It was introduced by IBM for internal use only in 1981, although initial work on BSP began during the early 1970s. BSP was later sold to organizations. It is a complex method dealing with interconnected data, processes, strategies, aims and organizational departments.

BSP was a new approach to IA; its goals are to:

 Understand issues and opportunities with current applications
 Develop future technology supporting the enterprise
 Provide executives with direction and a decision-making framework for IT expenditures
 Provide information systems (IS) with a developmental blueprint

The result of a BSP project is a technology roadmap aligning investments and business strategy.
BSP comprises 15 steps, which are classified into three sections by function.

Preparation

Study authorization
The essential first step in BSP is to obtain authorization for the study from management or an interested department. A number of roles must agree on the purpose and range of the study:
 Managing director
 May be a sponsor or team leader
 Verifies and approves study results
 Sponsor
 Provides financial support
 Team leader
 Chooses team members (four to seven people)
 Coordinates activities
 Documents and implements study (usually longer than eight weeks)
 Presents results to management
 Team member
 Usually a department head
 Analyzes and determines organizational information needs
 Recommends future IS content
 Presents results to management
 Secretary
 Documents study
 Assists team leader

Preparation
The second step is the team leader's study preparation. Its goal is to:
 Set timeframe
 Obtain documents
 Choose managers to interview
 Procure meeting and interview space
 Inform team members of:
 Organizational functions 
 Organizational data-processing level
A product of this step is a lead study book with the above information, a study schedule, IT documents and diagrams.

Beginning
At the first meeting of the study, the sponsor explains the purpose and expected results of the study; the team leader presents the study plan, and the IT manager describes the current state and the role of IS in the organization.

Analysis
The analysis is the most important part of BSP. The team searches for an appropriate organizational structure as it defines business strategy, processes and data classes and analyzes current information support.

Strategy
This step define strategic targets and how to achieve them within the organization:
 Adaptating to the customer´s desires
 Centrally-planned reservations, stock, payments
 Improvements in checking in, shipping, presentation, advertising, partner relations and stock management
 New customers
 Noise reduction
 Paperless processes
 Product-portfolio expansion
 Loss and cost reduction
 Simplifying customer order cycle
 Transport coordination
 Upgrade of production line
 Updating information
The team works from these strategic targets. Organizational units are departments of the organization. Each department is responsible for a strategic target.

Processes
There are  about 40-60 business processes in an organization (depending on its size), and it is important to choose the most profitable ones and the department responsible for a particular process. Examples include:
 Contact creation
 Hangaring
 Invoicing
 Monitoring
 Airplane coordination and service
 New-customer registration
 Service catalog creation
 Reservations
 Employee training
 Transfers
 Car rental

Data classes
There are usually about 30–60 data classes, depending on the size of the organization. Future IS will use databases based on these classes. Examples include:
 Accommodation
 Branches
 Corporation
 Customer
 Employee
 Invoice
 Load
 Airplane
 Purchase order
 Service catalog
 Supplier
 Vehicle

Information support
The purpose of this step is to check the applications used by an organization, evaluating the importance of each to eliminate redundancy.

Management discussion
In the final analytical step the team discusses its results with management to confirm (or refute) assumptions, provide missing information, reveal deficiencies in the organization and establish future priorities.

Issue results
All documents created during the analysis are collected, serving as a base for future information architecture. The organization classifies and dissects all identified problems; a list is made of the cause and effect of each problem, which is integrated into the future IS.

(marque)

Conclusion

Defining information architecture
To define an organization's information architecture, it is necessary to connect the information subsystems using matrix processes and data classes to find appropriate subsystems. The organization then reorders processes according to the product (or service) life cycle.

Establishing IS-development priorities
A number of criteria (costs and development time, for example) establish the best sequence of system implementation. High-priority subsystems may be analyzed more deeply. This information is given to the sponsor, who determines which information subsystems will be developed.

Verifying study impact
An IS planning and management study should be conducted. When the organization has finished its work on processes and data classes, it should explore the functions and goals of the system with a list of requested departmental changes and a cost analysis.

Proposals
Final recommendations and plans are made for the organization during this step, which encompasses information architecture, IS management and information-subsystem development and includes costs, profits and future activities.

Presentation
This is the agreement of all interested parties (team, management and sponsor) on future actions.

Final step
The organization should establish specific responsibilities during the project's implementation. There is usually a controlling commission, ensuring consistency across the IS.

BSP, in addition to its value to IS planning, introduced the process view of a firm. The business process reengineering of the 1990s was built on this concept. It also demonstrated the need to separate data from its applications using it, supporting the database approach to software development methodology.

Criticism
The effectiveness of BSP and other similar planning methodologies has been questioned:
 The historical analysis shows that BSP and subsequent enterprise architecture (EA) methodologies are "fundamentally flawed".
 The research concludes that "the [BSP] approach is too expensive, its benefits are too uncertain, and it is organisationally difficult to implement".
 The research concludes that "given their great expense and time consumption, [...] findings seriously challenge the utility of the [BSP and similar] planning methodologies".
 The research concludes that "in summary, strategic information systems planners are not particularly satisfied with [the BSP methodology]. After all, it requires extensive resources. [...] When the [BSP] study is complete, further analysis may be required before the plan can be executed. The execution of the plan might not be very extensive".
 The study of BSP and similar planning methodologies concludes that "the evidence [...] presented here strongly supports the need for a fundamental rethinking of IS planning methodologies".

References

Strategic management